Rakhine United Football Club is a Burmese professional football club based in Rakhine State that play in the Myanmar National League. They use the Wai Thar Li Stadium in Sittwe as their home ground.

History
Founded in 2009, the club changed their name to Rakhapura United in December 2010. In December 2012, the club reverted to their original name.

Kit and sponsorship history

Coaches

2023 Final squad

Staff and coaches
Chairman: U Zaw Min Thein
Vice President: U Nay Htet Lin, U Tin Htoo Aung, U Thar Htet
General Manager: U Ko Ko Win
Head coach: U Than Wai 
Assistant coach: U Zaw Naing
Fitness and conditioning Coach: U Maung Maung Myint
Goalkeeping coach: U Wai Lin Tun
Physiotherapist: U Wunna Tun
Media Officer: U Thet Htoo Naing Oo
Finance Officer: Daw Su Mon Lwin

References

External links
 Official Facebook page

Football clubs in Myanmar
Myanmar National League clubs
Sittwe
Association football clubs established in 2010
2010 establishments in Myanmar